The Gora Kabristan or Gora Cemetery in Lahore, Pakistan is the one of the oldest Christian cemetery in Lahore.

Location
It is located adjutant to Forman Christian College.

History
It was developed after establishment of British Raj in the Punjab Region as their primary Cemetery in Lahore. The name literally means the white graveyard. 'Gora' is an Urdu word and is used by Pakistanis to refer to light skinned or white people. Therefore, a more accurate translation would be "white people's graveyard." The term is not always necessarily used in a derogatory manner.

Notable interments

Many notable personalities of British era and early Pakistani era are buried there, including
 Cecil Chaudhry
 Geoffrey Langlands
 Princess Bamba Sutherland
 A.C. Woolner
 Alvin Robert Cornelius

External links
 Indian Cemeteries
 

Cemeteries in Lahore
Anglican cemeteries in Asia
Lutheran cemeteries